"The Impossible Dream (The Quest)" is a popular song composed by Mitch Leigh, with lyrics written by Joe Darion. The song is the most popular song from the 1965 Broadway musical Man of La Mancha and is also featured in the 1972 film of the same name starring Peter O'Toole.

The complete song is first sung by Don Quixote as he stands vigil over his armor, in response to Aldonza (Dulcinea)'s question about what he means by "following the quest". It is reprised partially three more times – the last by prisoners in a dungeon as Miguel de Cervantes and his manservant mount the drawbridge-like prison staircase to face trial by the Spanish Inquisition.

A version recorded by Jack Jones peaked at No. 35 on the U.S. Billboard Hot 100 chart and reached No. 1 on the Adult Contemporary chart.

Leigh received the Contemporary Classics Award from the Songwriter's Hall of Fame for the song.

Notable renditions

1965: Richard Kiley on the original Broadway cast album of Man of La Mancha
1966: Jack Jones (with altered lyrics) on his album The Impossible Dream; this version hit No. 35 on the U.S. Billboard Hot 100 chart and went to No. 1 on the Adult Contemporary chart
1966: Ed Ames on  his album More I Cannot Wish You
1966: Frank Sinatra on his album That's Life
1966: Jim Nabors on his album Love Me With All Your Heart, and performed in the 1967 Gomer Pyle, U.S.M.C. episode "The Show Must Go On"<ref>{{cite web|title=Jim Nabors Sings Stirring Version of 'The Impossible Dream On Gomer Pyle, U.S.M.C. |date=18 December 2015 |url=http://www.reshareworthy.com/jim-nabors-sings-the-impossible-dream/ |publisher=Reshareworthy.com |access-date=2016-09-29}}</ref>
1967: The Temptations on the album The Temptations in a Mellow Mood1967: Shirley Bassey on her album And We Were Lovers1967: Robert Goulet on his album More Great Songs From the Big Hit Shows: Robert Goulet On Broadway, Volume 2 
1967: Matt Monro on his album Invitation to Broadway1967: Brazilian singer Ronaldo Reys did a Portuguese translation titled Sonho Impossível, which was later covered by several Brazilian artists
1968: Roger Williams on his album More Than a Miracle1968: The Hesitations on their album Where We're At!1968: The Imperials on their album New Dimensions 
1968: Andre Kostelanetz on his album For the Young at Heart1968: Jacques Brel (in the French translation titled ("La Quête") on his album L'Homme de la Mancha1968: The Vogues on their album Turn Around, Look at Me1968: Glen Campbell on his album Hey Little One1968: Andy Williams on his album Honey1968: Cher on her album Backstage1968: The Smothers Brothers on their album Smothers Brothers Comedy Hour1968: Sergio Franchi on his album Wine and Song1969: Sammy Davis, Jr. on his album The Goin's Great1969: Roger Whittaker on his album This is Roger Whittaker1969: Scott Walker on his album Scott: Scott Walker Sings Songs from his TV Series1969: Liberace on his album I Play Piano and Sing (Volume Two)1969: Shani Wallis on her album As Long as He Needs Me1970: Roberta Flack on her album Chapter Two1970: Harry Secombe on his album "A Man And His Dreams"
1971: Malcolm Roberts on his album Sounds Like Malcolm Roberts1972: Elvis Presley on his album Elvis as Recorded at Madison Square Garden1972: The Mormon Tabernacle Choir and the Columbia Symphony Orchestra on the album Climb Every Mountain 
1974: Ken Boothe on his album Everything I Own1974: The Sensational Alex Harvey Band on their album The Impossible Dream1974: Maria Bethânia in the Brazilian translation titled "Sonho Impossível" her album A Cena Muda1984: Albertina Walker and the Christ Universal Temple Ensemble on the album The Impossible Dream1989: Colm Wilkinson on his album Stage Heroes1989: Scott Bakula as Sam Beckett in the Quantum Leap episode "Catch a Falling Star"
1992 General Craig, USMC (played by Jon Cypher), on Major Dad TV show S2E22.
1992: Carter USM on their album 1992 – The Love Album1994: Luther Vandross on his album Songs1995: Roger Whittaker on his album On Broadway1996: Tevin Campbell on the compilation album Rhythm of the Games: 1996 Olympic Games Album2000: José Carreras on the compilation album Tonight - Hits from the Musicals2001: Florence Ballard on her album The Supreme Florence Ballard2002: Brian Stokes Mitchell on the Broadway revival cast album of Man of La Mancha2003: Linda Eder on her album Broadway My Way2005: Aretha Franklin performed the song at the funeral of civil rights activist Rosa Parks 
2006: Andy Abraham on his debut album The Impossible Dream2006: Johnny Hallyday in the French translation titled La Quête on the live albums Flashback Tour : Palais des sports 2006 and La Cigale : 12-17 décembre 20062007: Christopher Lee on his album Revelation2007: Sarah Connor on her album Soulicious2007: Jed Madela on his album Only Human2008: Rhydian Roberts on his debut album Rhydian2009: The Mighty Mighty Bosstones recorded for the 7" Impossible Dream2009: The Republic Tigers on the iTunes tribute album His Way, Our Way2010: Alfie Boe on his album Bring Him Home, duet with Matt Lucas
2011: Jackie Evancho on her album Dream With Me Deluxe edition
2014: Susan Boyle on her album Hope2015: Christina Bianco as Miss Wyoming, Mindy Maloney in the TV movie Signed, Sealed, Delivered:The Impossible Dream
2015: Gerphil Flores sang the operatic version of the song as a contest piece for the grand finals of the inaugural season of Asia's Got Talent which put her on third place
2016: Ramon Jacinto on his first ballad album Romancing RJ2016: Cynthia Erivo performed the song at the 2016 Kennedy Center Honors
2017: Jason Manford on his debut album A Different Stage2020: Josh Groban on his album Harmony''

In politics
During Robert F. Kennedy's long shot campaign for the presidency in 1968, Senator George McGovern introduced him before a South Dakota stump speech by quoting from "The Impossible Dream". Afterwards Kennedy questioned McGovern whether he really thought it was impossible. McGovern replied, "No, I don't think it's impossible. I just... wanted the audience to understand it's worth making the effort, whether you win or lose." Kennedy replied, "Well, that's what I think." It was actually Robert Kennedy's favorite song. One of Kennedy's close friends, Andy Williams, was one of many vocal artists of the Sixties that recorded the song. The song was also a favorite of younger brother Ted Kennedy and was performed by Brian Stokes Mitchell at his memorial service in 2009.

The song was a favorite of Philippine hero Evelio Javier, the assassinated governor of the province of  Antique in the Philippines, and the song has become a symbol of his sacrifice for democracy.  Javier was shot and killed in the plaza of San Jose, Antique, during the counting following the 1986 Snap Elections, an act which contributed to the peaceful overthrow of Ferdinand Marcos by Cory Aquino in the People Power Revolution. Every year, Javier is remembered on Evelio Javier Day and the song is featured. The song's lyrics are written in brass on a monument in the plaza where he was shot.

Baseball
The 1967 Red Sox were baseball's big surprise that season. Coming off nine straight years of finishing ninth or tenth in the American League, they surprised the baseball world, under rookie manager Dick Williams, by winning the American League pennant, before losing by one run to the St. Louis Cardinals in the ninth inning of Game Seven of the World Series. During that season, the Red Sox became known as "The Impossible Dream Red Sox", and have been known as such ever since.

See also
 List of number-one adult contemporary singles of 1966 (U.S.)

References

Further reading 
 

1965 songs
1966 singles
Andy Williams songs
Elvis Presley songs
Glen Campbell songs
Jack Jones (singer) songs
Johnny Mathis songs
Sarah Connor (singer) songs
Scott Walker (singer) songs
Songs about dreams
Songs from musicals
Music based on Don Quixote